José Augusto Rodrigues França  (16 November 1922 – 18 September 2021) was a Portuguese historian, art critic, and professor.

Awards and honors
Medal of Honor of the City of Lisbon, 1992.
Grand Officer of the Order of Prince Henry (10 June 1991).
Grand Cross of the Order of Public Instruction (10 November 1992).
Grand Cross of the Order of Prince Henry (30 January 2006).
Medal of Cultural Merit (2012)

References

1922 births
2021 deaths
People from Tomar
20th-century Portuguese historians
Portuguese art critics
University of Lisbon alumni
Academic staff of NOVA University Lisbon
Grand Crosses of the Order of Prince Henry
Grand Officers of the Order of Prince Henry